The Austro-Italian border is a  land border along the Alps between the Republic of Italy and the Republic of Austria. A border has existed since 1861, but the current one only since 1919. It has been an EU internal border since 1 January 1995. The border was last changed in 1947. A large older change was in 1919 when South Tyrol was made part of Italy instead of Austria.

Provinces and states along the border

Italy 
 Trentino-Alto Adige/Südtirol
 Veneto
 Friuli Venezia Giulia

Austria 
 Tyrol
 Salzburg
 Carinthia

Traffic
The main arterial routes over this border go over the Brenner Pass. It has:
European route E45 (Autobahn A13 and Autostrada A22)
Brenner Railway

Other important routes are:
European route E55 (Autobahn A2 and Autostrada A23)
European route E66

See also
Treaty of Saint-Germain-en-Laye (1919)

References

 
European Union internal borders
1861 establishments in the Austrian Empire
1861 establishments in Italy
1861 in international relations
Borders of Austria
Borders of Italy
International borders